This is the discography of South Korean trio JYJ (formerly known as Junsu/Jejung/Yuchun in Japan). Formed in 2010, the group consists of Jaejoong, Yoochun and Junsu, who were formerly founding members of SM Entertainment's five-member boy band TVXQ.

Albums

Studio albums

Live albums
Thanksgiving Live in Dome (2011)

Extended plays

Singles

Other charted songs

Soundtrack contributions

DVDs

Music videos

Solo discography

See also
 List of songs recorded by JYJ
 TVXQ discography

References

External links
  
  
 
 

JYJ
Discographies of South Korean artists
K-pop music group discographies